Open-Architecture-System (OAS) is the main User interface and synthesizer software of the Wersi keyboard line. OAS improves on prior organ interfaces by allowing the user to add sounds, rhythms, third party programs and future software enhancements without changing hardware. Compared to previous organs which relied on buttons, OAS uses a touch screen to make programming easier.  OAS can host up to 4 separate VST software instruments, allowing for an expandable system similar to the Korg OASYS. OAS can support dynamic touch and aftertouch, but cannot support horizontal touch like the Yamaha Stagea Electone.

OAS Version 7

OAS Version 7 expands on previous versions by adding a new effects section. Separate effects are available for the accompaniment section, sequencer and drums.  Added effects include delay, reverb, phasing, wah wah, distortion, compressor, and flanger. In addition, version 7 includes 300 new sounds, 700 sounds in total. 

Version 7 adds the Wersi Open Art Arranger. This software enables the Wersi to use all Yamaha styles,  including those from the Tyros 2.

References

External links
Wersi USA home page
Wersi international home

Global OAS Users Group

Electric and electronic keyboard instruments
Software synthesizers